The following is a list of pipeline accidents in the United States in 2013. It is one of several lists of U.S. pipeline accidents. See also list of natural gas and oil production accidents in the United States.

Incidents 

This is not a complete list of all pipeline accidents. For natural gas alone, the Pipeline and Hazardous Materials Safety Administration (PHMSA), a United States Department of Transportation agency, has collected data on more than 3,200 accidents deemed serious or significant since 1987.

A "significant incident" results in any of the following consequences:
 fatality or injury requiring in-patient hospitalization
 $50,000 or more in total costs, measured in 1984 dollars
 liquid releases of five or more barrels (42 US gal/barrel)
 releases resulting in an unintentional fire or explosion

PHMSA and the National Transportation Safety Board (NTSB) post incident data and results of investigations into accidents involving pipelines that carry a variety of products, including natural gas, oil, diesel fuel, gasoline, kerosene, jet fuel, carbon dioxide, and other substances. Occasionally pipelines are repurposed to carry different products.

2013 
 On January 1, a Colonial Pipeline line was overpressured by improper operation, causing a spill of about 5,500 gallons of petroleum product in Greensboro, North Carolina. About 1,000 gallons of product was not recovered.
 On January 15, a utility crew struck and ruptured a 4-inch gas pipeline in Lewisville, Texas, causing a nearby house to explode later on. The explosion killed a man.
 An independent contractor installing fiber-optic cable for a cable company in Kansas City, Missouri inadvertently struck an underground gas line on February 19. Gas later caught fire, and created an explosion that destroyed a popular local restaurant, killing one of the workers there, and injuring about 15 others near the scene.
 A tug towing a barge struck and ruptured a Chevron LPG pipeline at Bayou Perot, a marshy area on the borders of Jefferson Parish and Lafourche Parish, Louisiana on March 12. The tug Captain was severely burned when the escaping gas ignited, and died several weeks later from those injuries.
 On March 8, pipeline equipment failure resulted in a spill of 6,000 barrels of crude oil, in eastern Columbia County, Arkansas.
 On March 18, a Chevron 8-inch petroleum products pipeline ruptured along a seam, spilling diesel fuel into Willard Bay State Park near Ogden, Utah. Wildlife was coated with diesel, but the fuel was prevented from entering into water supply intakes. About 25,000 gallons of diesel were spilled.
 A Williams Companies 24-inch gas gathering pipeline failed in Marshall County, West Virginia on March 22. There were no injuries.
 The 2013 Mayflower oil spill occurred when ExxonMobil's 20-inch Pegasus crude oil pipeline spilled near Mayflower, Arkansas on March 29, causing crude to flow through yards and gutters, and towards Lake Conway. Wildlife was coated in some places. Twenty-two houses were evacuated, due to the fumes and fire hazard. Estimates say the total amount of 190,000 gallons of diluted bitumen were spilled. Hook cracks and extremely low impact toughness in the LF-ERW seam of the pipe were identified as causes of the failure.
 On April 4, an explosion and fire occurred at a gas compressor station near Guthrie, Oklahoma. Nearby houses were evacuated. There were no injuries reported.
 A flash fire at a pipeline gas compressor station broke out when natural gas liquids ignited in Tyler County, West Virginia on April 11, seriously burning three workers, two of whom later died. The workers were performing pipeline pigging operations.
 On April 30, the Pegasus oil pipeline spilled a small amount of crude into a residential yard in Ripley County, Missouri, a month after the same pipe spewed thousands of barrels of crude in Arkansas. The Pegasus pipeline was out of service from the Mayflower, Arkansas spill, accounting for the minimal amount of oil spilled in Missouri.
 On May 9, diesel fuel was detected to be leaking from a Marathon pipeline in Indianapolis, Indiana. Over 20,000 gallons of diesel leaked, at a slow rate that was not detected by SCADA systems. Cleanup caused a nearby major road to be shut down for five days. There were no injuries reported.
 Late night on May 14, an explosion and fire hit a Williams Companies gas compressor station near Brooklyn Township, Pennsylvania. There were no reported injuries.
 On May 8, the Kinder Morgan Tejas pipeline compressor station near Crockett, Texas, required an emergency shutdown and subsequently had a fire that caused $7,502,188 in property damage.
 On May 18, a 24-inch fill line failed, on an Enbridge tank, in Cushing, Oklahoma, spilling about 105,000 gallons of crude oil. The cause was internal corrosion of the line.
 On May 30, two construction workers were injured, when a fire erupted during welding at a Williams Companies natural gas facility in Hunterdon County, New Jersey.
 A 12-inch gas transmission pipeline failed near Torrington, Wyoming on June 13. LF-ERW seam failure was suspected as cause. There was no fire or injuries.
 On June 18, in Washington Parish, Louisiana, a Kinder Morgan Florida Gas Transmission Company 30" diameter pipeline ruptured and exploded before dawn, jolting residents out of their beds. No one was seriously hurt but 55 homes were evacuated. The blast knocked down trees in an area about 200 yards across and the fire burned those within another 300 yards. "The ground around the crater is completely bare. The dirt around it is just like it had been cooked in a kiln," and an 80-foot section of pipe was destroyed.
 On July 4, a fire involved a gas compressor and a nearby ruptured 2-inch gas pipeline in Gilmore Township, Pennsylvania. There were no injuries.
 An 8-inch natural gas pipeline released gas from a rupture at 1,400 psi, for 90 minutes in New Franklin, Ohio on July 22, forcing 75 people to evacuate the area. Afterward, the local Fire Chief said that pipeline owners refused to give information to first responders in previous requests.
 Early on July 23, a downed 13,000 volt power line sparked a massive gas fire in Mamaroneck, New York when a gas main was damaged by the electricity. Three automobiles were destroyed, and houses were threatened for a time.
 On July 26, a leaking BP 20-inch crude oil pipeline spilled 50 to 100 barrels of crude oil in Washington County, Oklahoma. Some of the crude spilled into a drainage ditch leading to a water reservoir.
 On the evening of August 12, a 10-inch NGL pipeline exploded and caused a massive propane-ethane mix fire in Erie, Illinois. A number of nearby residents were evacuated for a while, but there were no injuries. About 772,000 gallons of mix were burned or lost. The cause was from a manufacturing defect.
 A leak developed on a valve on Longhorn Pipeline in Austin, Texas during maintenance on August 14, spilling about 300 gallons of crude oil. There were no evacuations.
 Atmos Energy crews dug into a 4-inch gas pipeline in Overland Park, Kansas on September 2, causing an explosion and fire. There was no major damage or injuries.
 A 10-inch gas gathering pipeline ruptured and burned in Newton County, Texas on September 21. About a dozen people from nearby houses were evacuated for a time. There were no injuries.
 On September 24, a Denton TX city water utility worker ruptured a 1/2-inch gas pipeline in Denton, Texas, which immediately caused a fire that gave the worker minor burns. There was no other significant damage.
 A farmer near Tioga, North Dakota smelled oil for several days, before discovering a leaking 6-inch 20-year-old Tesoro pipeline under his wheat field, on September 29. Crews tried to burn off the oil at first. The spill size was estimated at 865,000 gallons, and covered over seven acres. There were no injuries. Corrosion was suspected as being the cause. Governor Jack Dalrymple said he wasn't told of the spill until October 9. In May 2014, it was announced that it would 2 1/2 more years before the spilled crude would be cleaned up.
 On October 7, a gas pipeline burst in Howard County, Texas. There was no fire, but dangerous hydrogen sulfide in the gas forced evacuations of nearby residents. There were no injuries.
 On October 7, authorities were notified of a Lion Oil Trading and Transportation crude oil pipeline leak in Columbia County, Arkansas. It was estimated that the leak started on September 21. Oil spread into a Horsehead Creek tributary. The Environmental Protection Agency said that approximately 1,500 barrels of oil were lost, but one lawsuit against the oil company claimed the full amount was as much as 5,000 barrels.
 A 30-inch Northern Natural Gas pipeline exploded and burned in Harper County, Oklahoma on October 8. 220 feet of the pipe was ejected from the ground. Flames were seen for a number of miles, and four houses nearby were evacuated. Oklahoma Highway 283 was closed for several hours until the fire was determined to be under control and safe. There were no injuries.
 On October 29, a Koch Industries 8-inch pipeline spilled about 400 barrels of crude oil near Smithville, Texas. The oil polluted a private stock pond and two overflow reservoirs.
 A Chevron operated 10-inch LPG pipeline was ruptured by contractors for the company installing a Cathodic protection system, near Milford, Texas, on November 14, causing a large fire, and forcing the evacuation of Milford and 200 students of a nearby school. A nearby 14-inch pipeline was threatened by the failure, but did not fail. There were no injuries reported. About 183,000 gallons of propane burned.
 An ExxonMobil gas plant exploded and burned on November 17, near Kingsville, Texas. The plant burned for over a day, but there were no reported injuries.
 On November 18, a gas pipeline burst near Ranger, Texas, causing a fire in a field, with flames reaching 100 feet high. Some houses nearby were evacuated for a time. The owner of the pipeline, Hanlon Gas, had been installing a new compressor station, and they believe a malfunction led to the rupture and fire. There were no injuries reported.
 On November 28 a 30-inch Panhandle Eastern natural gas pipeline exploded in Hughesville, Missouri causing several nearby buildings to catch fire. There was a local evacuation but no injuries. Metallurgical examination determined the root cause of the failure to be corrosion.
 On December 9, a 2-inch pipe on a propane dehydrator failed at the Dixie Pipeline Terminal in Apex, North Carolina, forcing evacuations and sheltering in place at nearby businesses. There was no fire or explosion.
 A Sunoco pipeline was found leaking gasoline on December 20, near Coal Township, Pennsylvania, from external corrosion. About 266 to 471 gallons of product were spilled, and, 1,421 tons of soil were removed, as part of the remediation of that leak.
 On December 27, two natural gas company workers had minor burns when the pipeline they were working leaked, and the escaping gas exploded and ignited in Shrewsbury, Massachusetts. Flames 30 feet high knocked out phone service in the area.
 On December 31, a contractor accidentally cut a live LPG pipeline during demolition work at a pipeline facility, in LaPorte, Texas. 2 workers received minor burns, and, 30,000 gallons of LPG were burned.

References 

Lists of pipeline accidents in the United States